The BMW N40 is a DOHC four-cylinder petrol engine which replaced the 1.6 litre versions of the BMW M43. It was produced from 2001-2004 and only sold in several countries, where taxes favoured cars with smaller displacement engines. The N40 was replaced by the BMW N45.

Design 

The redline is 6,500 rpm.

Unlike the N42, the N40 does not have Valvetronic (variable valve lift).

Versions 

Applications:
 2001-2005 E46 316i/316ci/316ti (certain markets only)

See also 
 BMW
 List of BMW engines

References

N40

Straight-four engines
Gasoline engines by model